Dictionnaire des anarchistes is a biographical dictionary of French anarchists published in 2014 within the Le Maitron series.

Publication 

Le Maitron is a series of reference works: a 44-volume biographical dictionary of the French workers' movement, with additional volumes based on period, region (outside France), and theme. The Dictionnaire des anarchistes, on the anarchists, is one such thematic volume.
The work was originally conceived between historian , Radio Libertaire host Hugues Lenoir, and Maitron director  in 2006 and compiled by libertarian (anarchist) historians and activists from Alternative libertaire, Anarchist Federation (France), and Confédération nationale du travail. The work was originally expected for release in 2011.

References

Bibliography

External links 

 

2014 non-fiction books
French-language books
Le Maitron
French biographical dictionaries
Books about anarchism